Chak Phet Road (sometimes spelled Chakkraphet or Chakphet) is a road in Wang Burapha Phirom Subdistrict, Phra Nakhon District, Bangkok, with a total length of 1,120 m (3,674 ft).

Its name after a fort was called "Pom Chak Phet", southernmost of Rattanakosin Island at mouth of canal Khlong Rop Krung near the foot of Memorial Bridge in present day. It was one of 14 fortifications built to protect the capital from the early Rattanakosin period in the reign of King Phutthayotfa Chulalok (Rama I). Later, in the reign of King Chulalongkorn (Rama V), when the capital grew more. These fortifications were demolished.

Chak Phet Road began to be built on 28 September 1898, divided into two phases: the first phase, from Pom Chak Phet beside Wat Ratchaburana to Pak Khlong Talat, and the second phase from Pom Chak Phet to the intersection of Yaowarat, Maha Chai, Phiraphong Roads near Pom Maha Chai (Wang Burapha Intersection in present day) and Phahurat Road.

Although it is only a short road, it is considered an important trade route because it is located in the commercial district and runs through many important places, including King Rama I Memorial and Memorial Bridge, Pak Khlong Talat, Charoen Rat 31 Bridge, tip of Ban Mo Road, Chao Mae Thapthim Shrine, Gurdwara Sri Guru Singh Sabha, Phahurat,  Wang Burapha, and Saphan Han.

References

Streets in Bangkok
Phra Nakhon district
1898 establishments in Siam